Richard Johnston may refer to:

Politics
 Richard Johnston (died 1706), MP for Clogher (Parliament of Ireland constituency)
 Sir Richard Johnston, 1st Baronet (1743–1795), MP for Kilbeggan and Blessington
 Archibald D. Johnston (1940–2003), popularly known as Dick Johnston, provincial politician, Alberta, Canada
 Richard Johnston (Ontario politician) (born 1946), provincial politician, Ontario, Canada
 Ricky Johnston (born 1943), Australian politician

Other
 Richard C. Johnston, U.S. Air Force general
 Richard F. Johnston (1925–2014), American ornithologist, academic and author
 Richard Johnston (composer) (1917–1997), Canadian composer, arts administrator, music critic, and music educator
 Richard Johnston (musician), American blues musician
 Rich Johnston, comic book columnist
 Richard Malcolm Johnston (1822–1898), American writer and educator
 Dick Johnston (1863–1934), baseball player
Dick Johnston (journalist) (1919–2008), Canadian sports journalist
 Ritchie Johnston (1931–2001), New Zealand Olympic cyclist

See also
 Richard Johnstone (disambiguation)
 Richard Johnson (disambiguation)